George Gordon Wallace (born 20 June 1943) is a Scottish former professional football player and coach. Wallace was a record-setting goal-scorer in the Scottish league, and was named Scottish Football Writers' Player of the Year for 1967-68.  Wallace is currently employed in an advisory position with Dundee F.C.

A native of Dundee, Wallace began his career in 1961 with Montrose.  He went on to play for Raith Rovers, Dundee, and Dundee United.  He also played in the NASL for two seasons with the Seattle Sounders, 1976 and 1978.

Wallace once held the Scottish record of 264 league career goals scored, a tally since passed by Ally McCoist.  He scored 30 in 1967-68 to be awarded footballer of the year by the Scottish press, the first non Old Firm player to win the award.  Despite this achievement Wallace was never capped for Scotland.  He followed his playing days by going into coaching and management of a number of Scottish clubs, including Raith, Dundee, Dundee United and Dunfermline in a career spanning 45 years in football.

Wallace has also worked as a summariser for Dundee radio station Radio Tay.

Honours

Player 

Scottish League Cup: 1973–74

Manager 

Scottish Challenge Cup: 1990–91

Individual 

SFWA Footballer of the Year: 1967–68

See also
 List of footballers in Scotland by number of league appearances (500+)
List of footballers in Scotland by number of league goals (200+)

References

External links
 

1943 births
Living people
Footballers from Dundee
Scottish footballers
Scottish Football League players
Scottish football managers
Montrose F.C. players
Raith Rovers F.C. players
Dundee F.C. players
Dundee United F.C. players
North American Soccer League (1968–1984) players
Seattle Sounders (1974–1983) players
Dundee F.C. managers
Raith Rovers F.C. managers
Dundee United F.C. non-playing staff
Expatriate soccer players in the United States
Scottish Football League managers
Association football forwards
Scottish expatriate sportspeople in the United States
Scottish expatriate footballers
Association football player-managers